The Toyota GD engine series is a diesel engine produced by Toyota which appeared in 2015. It replaced the Toyota KD engine series as a diesel engine series mainly oriented to body-on-frame vehicles. The GD engine featured Economy with Superior Thermal Efficient Combustion (ESTEC) technology. Toyota claims they have a maximum thermal efficiency of 44 percent, "top class" at the time of introduction.

The GD engine series is produced in three countries: in Japan, in Bangalore, India by Toyota Industries Engine India (TIEI), and in Chonburi, Thailand by Siam Toyota Manufacturing (STM).

1GD-FTV

The 1GD-FTV is a  straight-4 common rail diesel engine with a variable nozzle turbocharger (VNT), chain drive and Intercooler. It has 16 valves and a DOHC (double overhead camshaft) design. Its compression ratio is 15.6:1.

Applications 

 Hino 200
 Toyota Coaster (B70) (2022-present)
 Toyota Dyna
 Toyota HiAce (H200) (2018–present)
 Toyota HiAce (H300) (2019–present)
 Toyota Hilux (AN120/AN130) (2015–present)
 Toyota Innova (AN140) (2016–2022)
 Toyota Land Cruiser Prado (J150) (2015–present)
 Toyota Fortuner (AN150) (2015–present)
 Toyota GranAce/Majesty (H300) (2019–present)
 Yanmar 4LV (marinized version of 1GD-FTV)
 Thairung Transformer II

2GD-FTV

The 2GD-FTV is a  straight-four common rail diesel engine with a variable nozzle turbocharger (VNT) and intercooler. It has 16 valves and a DOHC (double overhead camshaft) design. Its compression ratio is 15.6:1.

Applications 

 Toyota Hilux (AN120/AN130) (2015–present)
 Toyota Innova (AN140) (2015–2022)
 Toyota Fortuner (AN150) (2015–present)

See also 

 List of Toyota engines
 Toyota KD engine

References

GD
Diesel engines by model
Straight-four engines